The Canadian Forces were involved in the 1950–1953 Korean War and its aftermath.  26,000 Canadians participated on the side of the United Nations, and Canada sent eight destroyers. Canadian aircraft provided transport, supply and logistics. 516 Canadians died, 312 of which were from combat. After the war, Canadian troops remained for three years as military observers.

Background
Japan's defeat in World War II brought an end to 35 years of Japanese colonial rule of the Korean Peninsula.  The surrender of Japan to the Allied forces on 2 September 1945 led to the peninsula being divided into North and South Koreas, with the North occupied by troops from the Soviet Union, and the South, below the 38th parallel, occupied by troops from the United States.

The Soviet forces entered the Korean Peninsula on 10 August 1945, followed a few weeks later by the American forces who entered through Incheon. U.S. Army Lieutenant-General John R. Hodge formally accepted the surrender of Japanese forces south of the 38th Parallel on 9 September 1945 at the Government House in Seoul.

Although both rival factions tried initially to diplomatically reunite the divided nation, the Northern faction eventually tried to do so with military force. The North hoped that they would be able to unify the peninsula via insurgency, but the success of South Korea (Republic of Korea: ROK) in suppressing insurgency brought about the realization for the North that they would require military force. North Korea (Democratic People's Republic of Korea: DPRK) had expanded their army and Korean volunteers fighting in Manchuria in the Chinese Civil War had given their troops battle experience.  The North expected to win with the war in a matter of days.  Troops from North's Korean People's Army (KPA) crossed the 38th parallel on 25 June 1950 beginning a civil war.

The invasion of South Korea came as a surprise to the United Nations.  The day the war began, the United Nations immediately drafted UNSC Resolution 82, which called for:

all hostilities to end and North Korea to withdraw to the 38th Parallel;
a UN Commission on Korea to be formed to monitor the situation and report to the Security Council;
all UN members to support the United Nations in achieving this, and refrain from providing assistance to the North Korean authorities.

When the Korean People's Army crossed into South Korea on 25 June 1950, they advanced for the capital Seoul, which fell in less than a week.

North Korea's forces continued toward the port of Pusan, a strategic goal and the seat of the ROK government. The Korean People's Army conquered all of Korea except for this tiny enclave at the end of the peninsula. The war was nearly won by the DPRK. In two days, the United States offered assistance and the United Nations Security Council asked its members to help repel the North Korean attack. Canada, the United States, Australia, United Kingdom, New Zealand, South Africa, India, the Philippines, Ethiopia, France, and other countries sent troops to Korea under a United Nations security council resolution.

Canadian Army involvement

Special Force
 
Lieutenant-General Charles Foulkes, then Chief of the General Staff was in favour of Canada providing an infantry brigade for the 1st Commonwealth Division.  Since Foulkes favoured keeping the Canadian Army's Mobile Striking Force intact for the defence of North America, he recommended recruiting a separate Special Force for the Korean War.

Recruits for the Special Force were enlisted for a period of eighteen months with recruits coming from both the Active Force, World War II veterans and adventure seeking young men.  The normal recruitment standards were lowered since "the army would not wish to retain the 'soldier of fortune' type of personnel on a long term basis'". Units of the Special Force would be second battalions of the existing three Permanent Force regiments.

On 15 August 1950, the 2nd Battalion was created within Princess Patricia's Canadian Light Infantry (PPCLI) as a component of the Canadian Army Special Force in response to the North Korean invasion of South Korea. The new battalion trained in Calgary and at CFB Wainwright, before boarding the USS Private Joe P. Martinez on 25 November 1950, to Pusan in South Korea. The battalion landed in Korea in December and trained in the mountains for eight weeks before finally taking part in the war on 6 February, becoming a component of the 27th British Commonwealth Brigade of the IX Corps in the 8th US Army. The 2nd Battalion of the PPCLI was the first Canadian infantry unit to take part in the Korean War.

Special Force Second Battalions of the Royal Canadian Regiment and Royal 22nd Regiment were formed and sent to Korea in 1951.
 
By spring 1951, 8500 Canadians troops were supporting the United Nations, alongside 12,500 British, 5000 Filipino troops and 5000 Turkish troops.

Area of operations

From the summer of 1951 to the end of the war, most of the Canadian involvement centered on a small area north of Seoul "between the 38th parallel on the south and the town of Chorwon on the north, and from the Sami-Chon River east to Chail-li".  The Canadian war front was about 30 miles across and was a section of the United Nations front occupied by British Commonwealth forces. Most of the Canadians' combat missions took place on the 30 mile zone. The Canadians' two main adversaries during the war were the Korean People's Army and the Chinese People's Volunteer Army in the Battle of Kapyong. Canada's military objective was to give military support towards the resolution of the war on the central front, which was central Korea.

Operation Killer

Operation Killer was a counter-offensive by the United Nations forces to push Communist Chinese and North Korean armies back behind the Han River and recover the South Korean capital. The operation began on February 21, 1951. The 900 Canadians of the 2PPCLI set off to the front on 15 February, 240 km away. It was cold and men sat in trucks for 48 hours before arriving. They suffered frostbite and numbed limbs, and the lubricants on their weapons froze during the journey.

The Canadians arrived 17 February at 3:00pm.  Their goal was to advance toward Hill 404. On their way, they were flanked on both sides but managed to continue up to the hill to have the high ground on the enemy for Operation Killer. On 21 February, the Patricias left the small village of Sangsok and headed north to their assigned objective of a new hill called Hill 419. This hill was defended by the Chinese. The Patricias D Company led by Captain J. G. Turnbull were to attack but the ridge of the hill gave an easy line of sight for the Chinese. The Canadians took fire from every direction from cannons, rockets and small arms fire. They were under intense fire. Their attack was postponed for 36 hours but they kept up aggressive patrols and eventually the Australians gained control of Hill 619. The Australians taking Hill 619 made the Chinese leave Hill 419 and the Canadians took the hill without serious opposition. From 21 to 28 February, the Patricias suffered 10 killed and more than 21 wounded. The operation ended on 6 March 1951.

The Canadians learned a strong lesson about the People's Volunteer Army during this Operation. They were told by British intelligence that there "was nothing surprising about the enemy: the concealment, mobility, poor marksmanship and stamina". The Canadians learned during the operation that the Chinese were very good at concealing automatic weapons along approach lines. Finally, the operation was successful in the objective that it had set with the United Nations forces.

Battle of Kapyong

In April 1951, Chinese forces of the 118th Division attacked the Kapyong Valley in force, and pushed South Korean and New Zealand troops into retreat. Under heavy pressure, the Korean 6th Division broke, and the line collapsed. American and South Korean men poured through a gap under protective covering fire from Australians who were holding their section of the line despite heavy pressure.

The 3rd Battalion, Royal Australian Regiment (3 RAR) and 2nd Battalion, Princess Patricia's Canadian Light Infantry (2 PPCLI) were ordered to halt this Chinese advance. The mission of the men of the 27th Commonwealth Brigade was to block the two approaches to Kapyong. In only a few hours, they managed to prepare defensive positions.

On 22 April 1951 the Chinese advanced towards Kapyong Valley defeating the ROK positions in their way. The 2 PPCLI became aware of the Chinese advance from two regiments of the 6th ROK who were retreating past their positions. As one Canadian recalled it, "[W]e looked out and all we could see were South Korean troops flying past us along with all these monstrous American Vehicles they were supplied with". With this overwhelming alarm, the Canadians started digging trenches and positioning themselves on Hill 677. They also put positions on the mile-long ridge that was connected to it. Hill 677 for the Canadians was positioned on the west side of the Kapyong River. On Hill 504, dug in were the 3 RAR which was on the other side of Hill 677 and who were also ready for the Chinese attack.

The Chinese 118th Division engaged their two forward battalions on 23 April. In the early part of the battle the 1st Battalion of the Middlesex Regiment and the 16th Field Regiment of the Royal New Zealand Artillery were all but cut off. The resistance of forward positions, held by the 2 PPCLI and 3 RAR, permitted the Middlesexes to withdraw. It moved into place to provide a reserve.

The initial Chinese attack at Kapyong engaged 3 RAR on Hill 504.  The Chinese then struck at the Canadian front. Waves of massed Chinese troops kept up the attack throughout the night of 23 April. After a night of fierce fighting Major Bernard O'Dowd, Officer Commanding, A Company, 3 RAR, managed to get through on a radio phone to a general of the 1st U.S. Marine Division. The general was incredulous, thinking it was an enemy agent speaking. He told O'Dowd that the unit no longer existed, that it had been wiped out the night before.

The Chinese had managed to infiltrate the brigade position by the morning of 23 April. The Australians and Canadians were facing the whole of the Chinese 118th Division. Throughout 24 April the battle was unrelenting. It devolved on both fronts into hand-to-hand combat with bayonet charges. The Australians, facing encirclement, were ordered to make an orderly fall back to new defensive positions late in the day of 24 April.

2 PPCLI was completely surrounded. Captain Mills, in command of D Company, was forced to call down artillery fire on his own positions on Hill 677 several times during the early morning hours of 25 April to avoid being overrun. It had to be resupplied by air drops during this time. By dawn the Chinese attack on the Canadian position had abated, and in the afternoon of 25 April the road through to the Canadians had been cleared of Chinese, at which time the 2nd Battalion was relieved.

The 16th Field Regiment, Royal New Zealand Artillery, also managed to withdraw and link up with the U.S. Army's 72nd Heavy Tank Battalion. These units provided close heavy gun support.

Canada lost 10 soldiers killed (out of allied losses of 47) and 23 wounded at this battle.

Patrols and skirmishes
On May 25, 1951, the 2nd Battalion PPCLI was transferred to the 25th Canadian Infantry Brigade within the 1st Commonwealth Division. For the rest of the war, the various infantry battalions of the PPCLI, the Royal 22nd Regiment, and The Royal Canadian Regiment, squadrons of Lord Strathcona's Horse (Royal Canadians), regiments of the Royal Canadian Horse Artillery, and various units of the Royal Canadian Army Medical Corps rotated in and out of the war.

Royal Canadian Navy in Korea

Three Royal Canadian Navy (RCN) destroyers were dispatched as Canada's initial response to the United Nations' call for assistance during the Korean War, and were sent to Korean waters to join other UN naval forces. The eight Canadian ships' duties included shore bombardments and the destruction of North Korean trains and railway lines. Initially dispatched in 1950, Canadian destroyers maintained a presence off the Korean peninsula until 1955.

The ships were first under fire during the bombardment of Inchon in the middle of January 1951. The coastal defence fire was inaccurate, and the ships doubled back and silenced the guns. Another bombardment at Inchon two days later was also successful, without damage. Canadian ships destroyed 8 of the 28 trains destroyed by United Nations forces, and  alone hit 3 trains.

One RCN aviator flew with the U.S. Navy.

Royal Canadian Air Force in Korea

In 1950, the Royal Canadian Air Force (RCAF) was heavily involved with the transportation of personnel and supplies in support of the Korean War.  No. 426 Transport Squadron was attached to the Military Air Transport Service. During Canada's involvement in the Korean War, 600 trans-Pacific flights were flown in Canadair North Stars, carrying 3000 tons of cargo and 13,000 passengers. The squadron suffered no losses.

The RCAF was not involved with a combat role since no jet fighter squadrons capable of the type of combat required in Korea were yet in service, and capable fighter squadrons that later did become operational were allocated to NATO duty in Europe. Twenty-two RCAF fighter pilots, however, flew the North American F-86 Sabre on exchange duty with the United States Air Force (USAF) in Korea so that they could gain combat experience. Between them, these pilots were credited with nine Mikoyan-Gurevich MiG-15s destroyed, two probable kills, and ten damaged in the course of 1036 sorties. They were awarded seven Distinguished Flying Crosses, one Commonwealth Distinguished Flying Cross, and four Air Medals. One was shot down and captured due to friendly fire.
One Canadian famously known for being awarded the Distinguished Flying Cross was Ernie Glover. He was also a World War II veteran who flew Hurricane fighter planes. He was known for shooting down three enemy planes in less than two days and contributing a major effort to the South Korean air support throughout the war.  During the war, the United Nations had air dominance, giving them an advantage in air to ground offences.

When the USAF experienced a shortage of F-86s, Canada supplied sixty Canadair Sabres.

Cessation of hostilities

On 29 November 1952, U.S. President-elect Dwight D. Eisenhower fulfilled a campaign promise by going to Korea to find out what could be done to end the conflict. With the UN's acceptance of India's proposal for a Korean armistice, a cease-fire was established on 27 July 1953, by which time the front line was back around the 38th parallel, and so a demilitarised zone (DMZ) was established around it, defended by North Korean troops on one side and by South Korean, American and UN troops on the other. The DMZ runs north of the parallel towards the east, and to the south as it travels west. The site of the peace talks, Kaesong, the old capital of Korea, was part of the South before hostilities broke out but is currently a special city of the North. North Korea and the United States signed the Armistice Agreement, which Syngman Rhee refused to sign.

After the war ended, Canadians remained in Korea for three years as military observers.

Between 1950 and 1956, over 25,000 Canadians served in Korea, and 516 died, due to enemy action, illness or accident. The United Nations Memorial Cemetery in Busan, South Korea has the remains of 378 Canadians who died during the war.

Timeline of Canadian involvement in Korea

See also

 Korean War Memorial Wall (Canada)
 Korean War in popular culture
 List of Korean War weapons
 Military history of Australia during the Korean War

References

Further reading

 
 

Official accounts – National Defence and the Canadian Forces

Historical Section General Staff, Army Headquarters (1956) Canada's Army in Korea: The United Nations Operations, 1950–53, and Their Aftermath Queen's Printer (Downloadable PDF)
Wood, F.W (1966) Official History of the Canadian Army in Korea: Strange Battleground Queen's Printer, Ottawa (Downloadable PDF)
Thorgrimmson, E.C. Russell (1956) Canadian Naval Operations in Korean Waters, 1950–1955 Naval Historical Section, Canadian Forces Headquarters, Ottawa (Downloadable PDF)

External links
. Veterans Affairs Canada
Canadians in Korea – Korea Veterans Association of Canada
Forgotten Heroes: Canada and the Korean War – CBC Digital Archives
. The Royal Canadian Regiment

Foreign relations of Canada
Korea
Korean War